List of bilateral animal orders  contains the Bilateria of the animal subkingdom Eumetazoa, divided into four superphyla, Deuterostomia, and the three Protostome superphyla, Ecdysozoa, and the two Spiralia superphyla, Platyzoa and Lophotrochozoa.

Phylum Xenacoelomorpha 
 Subphylum Xenoturbelida
 Class incertae sedis (Family Xenoturbellidae)
 Subphylum Acoelomorpha
 Class Acoela
 Order incertae sedis (16 families)
 Class Nemertodermatida
 Order incertae sedis (2 families)

Nephrozoa (unranked)

Infrakingdom Deuterostomia

Phylum Chordata

Ambulacraria

Phylum Hemichordata 

 Class Enteropneusta (Acorn worms)
 Order Enteropneusta
 Class Graptolithina †
 Order Camaroidea †
 Order Crustoidea †
 Order Dendroidea †
 Order Dithecoidea †
 Order Graptoloidea †
 Order Stolonoidea †
 Order Tuboidea †
 Class Planctosphaeroidea
No order, one genus, one species Planctosphaera pelagica
 Class Pterobranchia 
 Order Cephalodiscida
 Order Rhabdopleurida

Phylum Echinodermata

Infrakingdom Protostomia

Superphylum Ecdysozoa

Cycloneuralia (unranked)

Scalidophora (unranked)

Phylum Kinorhyncha 

No class, 2 orders, called mud dragons, very common in mud or sand
 Order Cyclorhagida
 Order Homalorhagida

Phylum Loricifera 
 
No class, one order Nanaloricida

Phylum Priapulida 

 Class Priapulimorpha
 Order Priapulimorphida
 Family Priapulidae
 Family Tubiluchidae
 Class Halicryptomorpha
 Order Halicryptomorphida
 Class Seticoronaria
 Order Seticoronarida
 Genus Maccabeus

Nematoida (unranked)

Phylum Nematoda

Phylum Nematomorpha 
 Class Gordioidea
 Class Nectonematoida

Panarthropoda (unranked)

Phylum Lobopodia † 
Class Dinocaridida 
 Kerygmacheloidea
 Kerygmachela
 Pambdulurion
 Anomalocaromorpha
 Parapeytoia
 Anomalocaria
 Opabiniidae
 Opabinia
 Myoscolex
 Anomalocarida
 Pennsylvaniocaris
 Piococaris
 Sarocaris
 Paranomalocaris
 Anomalocarididae
 Class Xenusia 
 Order Archonychophora
 Luolishaniidae
Luolishania
Miraluolishania
 Paucipodiidae 
Paucipodia 
 Order Protonychophora
 Aysheaiidae
Aysheaia 
Xenusiidae 
Xenusion 
Jianshanopodia
Hadranax
Siberion 
 Order Archonychophora
Luolishaniidae
Luolishania
Miraluolishania
Paucipodiidae
Paucipodia
 Order Scleronychophora
 Eoconchariidae
Microdictyon
Quadratapora
Fusuconcharium
Hallucigeniidae
Hallucigenia
Cardiodictyidae
Cardiodictyon
 Order Paronychophora
Onychodictyidae
Onychodictyon
 Order unassigned 
Orstenotubulus
Carbotubulus 
Mureropodia

Phylum Onychophora 
 Order Euonychophora
Family Peripatidae
Family Peripatopsidae
Order Ontonychophora †
Family Helenodoridae †
Family Tertiapatoidea †

Tactopoda (unranked)

Phylum Tardigrada  

 Class Eutardigrada
 Order Apochela
 Family Milnesiidae
 Order Parachela
 Family Beornidae
 Family Calohypsibiidae
 Family Eohypsibiidae
 Family Hypsibiidae
 Family Macrobiotidae
 Family Microhypsibiidae
 Family Necopinatidae
 Class Heterotardigrada
 Order Arthrotardigrada
 Family Archechiniscidae
 Family Batillipedidae
 Family Coronarctidae
 Family Halechiniscidae
 Family Renaudarctidae
 Family Stygarctidae
 Order Echiniscoidea
 Family Echiniscidae
 Family Echiniscoididae
 Family Oreellidae

Phylum Arthropoda

Spiralia (unranked)

Gnathifera (unranked)

Phylum Gnathostomulida 
No classes
 Order Bursovaginoidea
 Order Filospermoidea

Phylum Micrognathozoa 
Some dispute here with Micrognathozoa as the class and Limnognathia as the order

Phylum Cycliophora  
 Class Eucycliophora
 Order Symbiida
 Family Symbiidae
 Genus Symbion

Syndermata (unranked)

Phylum Rotifera 

 Class Bdelloidea
 Order Bdelloida
 Class Monogononta
 Order Collothecida
 Order Flosculariida
 Order Ploimida
 Class Seisonidea
 Order Seisonida

Phylum Acanthocephala 

 Class Archiacanthocephala
 Order Apororhynchida
 Order Gigantorhynchida
 Order Moniliformida
 Order Oligacanthorhynchida
 Class Eoacanthocephala
 Order Gyracanthocephala
 Order Neoechinorhynchida
 Class Palaeacanthocephala
 Order Echinorhynchida
 Order Polymorphida

Platytrochozoa (unranked)

Mesozoa (unranked)

Phylum Dicyemida 
No classes, no orders, families Conocyemidae, Dicyemidae and Kantharellidae

Phylum Monoblastozoa 
No classes, no orders, family Salinellidae

Phylum Orthonectida 
No classes, no orders, families Pelmatosphaeridae and Rhopaluridae

Rouphozoa (unranked)

Phylum Platyhelminthes

Class Rhabditophora
Subclass Macrostomorpha
Order Dolichomicrostomida
Subclass Trepaxonemata
Infraclass Neoophora
Parvclass Eulecithophora
Superorder Adiaphanida
Order Fecampiida
Order Prolecithophora
Order Tricladida
Order Rhabdocoela
Order Bothrioplanida
Order Lecithoepitheliata
Order Proseriata
Order Gnosonosemida
Order Polycladida
Order Prorhynchida
Subphylum Neodermata
Class Cestoda
Subclass Eucestoda
Order Bothriocephalidea
Order Caryophyllidea
Order Cathetocephalidea
Order Cyclophyllidea
Order Diphyllidea
Order Diphyllobothriidea
Order Haplobothriidea
Order Lecanicephalidea
Order Litobothriidea
Order Nippotaeniidea
Order Onchoproteocephalidea
Order Phyllobothriidea
Order Proteocephalidea
Order Pseudophyllidea
Order Rhinebothriidea
Order Spathebothriidea
Order Tetrabothriidea
Order Tetraphyllidea
Order Trypanorhyncha
Class Monogenea
Subclass Monopisthocotylea
Order Capsalidea
Order Dactylogyridea
Order Gyrodactylidea
Order Monocotylidea
Order Montchadskyellidea
Subclass Polyopisthocotylea
Order Chimaericolidea
Order Diclybothriidea
Order Mazocraeidea
Order Polystomatidea
Class Trematoda

Subclass Aspidogastrea
Order Aspidogastrida
Order Stichocotylida
Subclass Digenea

Order Diplostomida
Order Plagiorchiida

Phylum Gastrotricha 
No classes
 Order Chaetonotida
 Order Macrodasyida

Superphylum Lophotrochozoa

Phylum Mollusca

Phylum Annelida

Kryptotrochozoa (unranked) 
 Phylum Nemertea 
 Class Anopla
 Order Heteronemertea
 Order Palaeonemertea
 Class Enopla
 Order Bdellonemertea
 Order Hoplonemertea
 Lophophorata (unranked)
 Brachiozoa (unranked) 
 Phylum Hyolitha †
 Order Hyolithida 
 Order Orthothecida
 Phylum Brachiopoda 
 Class Lingulata
 Order Lingulida
 Order Discinida
 Class Craniata/Craniforma
 Order Craniida
 Class Rhynchonellata
 Order Terebratulida
 Order Rhynchonellida
 Phylum Phoronida 
No classes, no orders, family Phoronidae
 Bryozoa (unranked)
 Phylum Ectoprocta
 Class Gymnolaemata
 Order Cheilostomata
 Order Ctenostomatida
 Class Phylactolaemata
 Order Plumatellida
 Class Stenolaemata
 Order Cryptostomata †
 Order Cryptostomida †
 Order Cyclostomatida
 Order Cystoporata †
 Order Cystoporida †
 Order Esthonioporata †
 Order Fenestrida †
 Order Hederellida †
 Order Melicerititida †
 Order Rhabdomesida †
 Order Trepostomatida †
 Phylum Entoprocta 
No classes, no orders, families Barentsiidae, Loxokalypodidae, Loxosomatidae and Pedicellinidae

References

 Bilateral animals
Bilaterian